The Powers of Ten films are two short American documentary films written and directed by Charles and Ray Eames. Both works depict the relative scale of the Universe according to an order of magnitude (or logarithmic scale) based on a factor of ten, first expanding out from the Earth until the entire universe is surveyed, then reducing inward until a single atom and its quarks are observed.

History and background
The first film, A Rough Sketch for a Proposed Film Dealing with the Powers of Ten and the Relative Size of Things in the Universe, was a prototype and was completed in 1968; the second film, Powers of Ten: A Film Dealing with the Relative Size of Things in the Universe and the Effect of Adding Another Zero, was completed in 1977.

The Powers of Ten films were adaptations of the book Cosmic View (1957) by Dutch educator Kees Boeke. Both films, and a book based on the second film, follow the form of the Boeke original, adding color and photography to the black and white drawings employed by Boeke in his seminal work.

The 1977 film has a number of changes from the prototype, including being entirely in color, moving the starting location from Miami to Chicago, removing the relativistic (time) dimension, introducing an additional two powers of ten at each extreme, a change in narrator from Judith Bronowski to Philip Morrison, and much-improved graphics.

In 1998, Powers of Ten, the 1977 version, was selected for preservation in the United States National Film Registry by the Library of Congress as being "culturally, historically, or aesthetically significant".

Synopsis

1968 version 
This version of the film has two clocks in the corner showing the comparison between the viewer's time and that of Earth time. As the viewer's speed increases, Earth time, relative to the viewer, also increases.
It was installed in the Smithsonian Institution's National Air and Space Museum's Life in the Universe gallery at the time of the museum's opening in 1976, until the gallery's closure in 1978.

There is also a 1968 National Film Board of Canada film entitled Cosmic Zoom which covers the same subject using animation.  It is wordless, using sped-up music during the return trips to normal size.

1977 version 
The film begins with an overhead view of a man and woman picnicking in a park at the Chicago lakefront — a  overhead image of the figures on a blanket surrounded by food and books they brought with them, one of them being The Voices of Time by J. T. Fraser. The man (played by Swiss designer Paul Bruhwiler) then sleeps, while the woman (played by Eames staffer Etsu Garfias) starts to read one of the books.

Related books

Related films 
 Cosmic Zoom (1968), an eight-minute short from Canada.
 Cosmic Voyage (1996), a loose remake of Powers of Ten in IMAX format for the National Air and Space Museum.
 Our Universe is SO big, it's mindblowing! (2021)

See also
Cosmic Eye (2012), remake of Powers of Ten
 Orders of magnitude
 Earth's location in the universe

References

External links 
 Official website: 
 Exhibit at the California Academy of Sciences

 "Powers of Ten" essay by Daniel Eagan in America's Film Legacy: The Authoritative Guide to the Landmark Movies in the National Film Registry, A&C Black, 2010 , pages 752-753 

1968 films
1977 films
1968 short films
1977 short films
United States National Film Registry films
Documentary films about science
Documentary films about mathematics
American short documentary films
Orders of magnitude
Films set in Chicago
Holism
Films directed by Charles and Ray Eames
Films scored by Elmer Bernstein
1970s English-language films
1960s English-language films
1960s American films
1970s American films